Yūsaku, Yusaku or Yuusaku is a masculine Japanese given name.

Possible writings
Yūsaku can be written using different combinations of kanji characters. Some examples: 

勇作, "courage, make"
勇策, "courage, scheme"
雄作, "masculine, make"
雄策, "masculine, scheme"
祐作, "to help, make"
祐策, "to help, scheme"
友作, "friend, make"
友策, "friend, scheme"
優作, "superiority, make"
優策, "superiority, scheme"
有作, "to have, make"
有策, "to have, scheme"
悠作, "long time, make"
悠策, "long time, scheme"

The name can also be written in hiragana ゆうさく or katakana ユウサク.

Notable people with the name
, Japanese writer
, Japanese baseball player
, Japanese rugby union player
, Japanese businessman
, Japanese actor
, Japanese golfer
, Japanese weightlifter
, Japanese footballer
, Japanese general
, Japanese footballer
, Japanese actor and voice actor

See also
79333 Yusaku, a main-belt asteroid

Japanese masculine given names